Çerikli railway station is a railway station in Çerikli, Turkey. The station was originally opened on 20 November 1925 by the Anatolian—Baghdad Railways and was one of the first railway stations built by the newly formed Republic of Turkey.

TCDD Taşımacılık operates three daily intercity trains from Ankara; the Doğu Express to Kars, the Southern Express to Kurtalan and the Van Lake Express to and Tatvan. The latter two operate as a single train until Yolçatı.

References

External links
Çerikli station timetable

Railway stations in Kırıkkale Province
Railway stations opened in 1925
1925 establishments in Turkey